McLuney is an unincorporated community in Perry County, in the U.S. state of Ohio.

History
McLuney was founded in 1855, and named after nearby McLuney Creek. A post office called McLuney was established in 1887, and remained in operation until 1941.

Notable person
John Wesley Iliff, a Colorado rancher, was born at McLuney in 1831.

References

Unincorporated communities in Perry County, Ohio
Unincorporated communities in Ohio
1855 establishments in Ohio
Populated places established in 1855